Galen Augustus Carter (June 22, 1832 – November 10, 1893) was a member of the Connecticut Senate representing the 12th district from 1874 to 1875.

He was born June 22, 1832, in New York City, the son of Galen Carter and Ann Eliza Ketchum.

He was a partner in the firm of Jacob Little & Company, member of the New York Stock Exchange.

In November 1853, he married Mary C. Davenport

He was elected a burgess of the Borough of Stamford.

In 1874, he was elected to the Connecticut Senate.

References

Further reading 
 Stamford Historical Society - Galen A. Carter 1832–1893

1832 births
1893 deaths
Columbia College (New York) alumni
Democratic Party Connecticut state senators
Politicians from New York City
Politicians from Stamford, Connecticut
19th-century American politicians